Til Kingdom Come may refer to:
Til Kingdom Come (film), 2020 documentary film
a reference to the Kingdom of God in Christian eschatology
idiomatically, "a very long time" or "never", see Hyperbole
"Til Kingdom Come", a song by Pop Evil from Up
"Til Kingdom Come", a hidden track by Coldplay from X&Y

See also
Kingdom Come (disambiguation)
To Kingdom Come (disambiguation)